In chemistry and physics, the dimensionless mixing ratio is the abundance of one component of a mixture relative to that of all other components. The term can refer either to mole ratio (see concentration) or mass ratio (see stoichiometry).

In atmospheric chemistry and meteorology

Mole ratio
In atmospheric chemistry, mixing ratio usually refers to the mole ratio ri, which is defined as the amount of a constituent ni divided by the total amount of all other constituents in a mixture:

The mole ratio is also called amount ratio.
If ni is much smaller than ntot (which is the case for atmospheric trace constituents), the mole ratio is almost identical to the mole fraction.

Mass ratio
In meteorology, mixing ratio usually refers to the mass ratio of water , which is defined as the mass of water  divided by the mass of dry air in a given air parcel:

The definition is similar to that of specific humidity.

Mixing ratio of mixtures or solutions
Two binary solutions of different compositions or even two pure components can be mixed with various mixing ratios by masses, moles, or volumes.

The mass fraction of the resulting solution from mixing solutions with masses m1 and m2 and mass fractions w1 and w2 is given by:

where m1 can be simplified from numerator and denominator 

and

is the mass mixing ratio of the two solutions.

By substituting the densities ρi(wi) and considering equal volumes of different concentrations one gets:

Considering a volume mixing ratio rV(21)

The formula can be extended to more than two solutions with mass mixing ratios 

to be mixed giving:

Volume additivity 
The condition to get a partially ideal solution on mixing is that the volume of the resulting mixture V to equal double the volume Vs of each solution mixed in equal volumes due to the additivity of volumes. The resulting volume can be found from the mass balance equation involving densities of the mixed and resulting solutions and equalising it to 2:

implies

Of course for real solutions inequalities appear instead of the last equality.

Solvent mixtures mixing ratios

Mixtures of different solvents can have interesting features like anomalous conductivity (electrolytic) of particular lyonium ions and lyate ions generated by molecular autoionization of protic and aprotic solvents due to Grotthuss mechanism of ion hopping depending on the mixing ratios. Examples may include hydronium and hydroxide ions in water and water alcohol mixtures, alkoxonium and alkoxide ions in the same mixtures, ammonium and amide ions in liquid and supercritical ammonia, alkylammonium and alkylamide ions in ammines mixtures, etc....

References

Chemical properties
Dimensionless numbers of chemistry